This article describes the etymology of Wales, a country of the United Kingdom.

Origins
The English words "Wales" and "Welsh" derive from the same Old English root (singular , plural ), a descendant of Proto-Germanic *Walhaz, which was itself derived from the name of the Gaulish people known to the Romans as Volcae and which came to refer indiscriminately to inhabitants of the Western Roman Empire. The Old English-speaking Anglo-Saxons came to use the term to refer to the Britons in particular; the plural form  evolved into the name for their territory, Wales. The modern names for various Romance-speaking people in Continental Europe (e.g.

Historically in Britain, the words were not restricted to modern Wales or to the Welsh but were used to refer to anything that the Anglo-Saxons associated with the Britons, including other non-Germanic territories in Britain (e.g. Cornwall) and places in Anglo-Saxon territory associated with Britons (e.g. Walworth in County Durham and Walton in West Yorkshire).

These words (both of which are pronounced ) are descended from the Brythonic word combrogi, meaning "fellow-countrymen". The use of the word  as a self-designation derives from the location in the post-Roman Era (after the arrival of the Anglo-Saxons) of the Welsh (Brythonic-speaking) people in modern Wales as well as in northern England and southern Scotland. In particular, the term was not applied to the Cornish or the Breton peoples, who are of similar heritage, culture, and language to the Welsh. The word came into use as a self-description probably before the 7th century.
In Welsh literature, the word  was used throughout the Middle Ages to describe the Welsh, though the older, more generic term  continued to be used to describe any of the Britonnic peoples (including the Welsh) and was the more common literary term until . Thereafter  prevailed as a reference to the Welsh.

The Latinised forms of these names, Cambrian, Cambric and Cambria, survive as lesser-used alternative names for Wales, Welsh and the Welsh people. Examples include the Cambrian Mountains (which cover much of Wales and gave their name to the Cambrian geological period), the newspaper Cambrian News, and the organisations Cambrian Airways, Cambrian Railways, Cambrian Archaeological Association and the Royal Cambrian Academy of Art. The Cumbric language, which is thought to have been closely related to Welsh, was spoken in this area until becoming extinct around the 12th century.

References

History of Wales
Etymology